Lazarus Bendavid (18 October 1762, in Berlin – 28 March 1832, in Berlin) was a German mathematician and philosopher known for his exposition of Kantian philosophy.

Biography
Bendavid was a Jewish Kantian philosopher. After his graduation from the University of Berlin he lectured for some years on the philosophy of Kant in Vienna. His lectures being discouraged by the Austrian government during a general purge of foreigners, Bendavid returned to Berlin, where he found government employment and continued to lecture and write.

Works
 Uber die Parallellinien (On parallel lines; Berlin, 1786)
 Versuch einer logischen Auseinandersetzung des mathematisch-unendlichen (Treatise on the logical explanation of the mathematical concept of infinity; Berlin 1796)
 Versuch über das Vergnügen (Treatise on pleasure; 2 vols., Vienna 1794)
 Vorlesungen über die Kritik der reinen Vernunft (Lectures on the criticism of pure reason; Vienna, 1795)
 Vorlesungen über die Kritik der praktischen Vernunft (Lectures on the criticism of practical reason; Vienna, 1796)
 Vorlesungen über die Kritik der Urteilskraft (Lectures on the criticism of the power of judgment; Vienna, 1796)
 Rede über den Zweck der Kritischen Philosophie (Talk on the goal of critical philosophy; Vienna, 1796)
 Selbstbiographie (Autobiography; Berlin, 1804)

Notes

References

1762 births
1832 deaths
Writers from Berlin
People from the Margraviate of Brandenburg
18th-century German Jews
18th-century German mathematicians
19th-century German mathematicians
German philosophers
19th-century German writers
19th-century German male writers
Humboldt University of Berlin alumni
18th-century German male writers